Breakup at a Wedding is the first film from comedy collective PERIODS. Directed by Victor Quinaz and written by Anna Martemucci, Victor Quinaz, and Philip Quinaz, the movie was produced by Before the Door Pictures (All Is Lost, Margin Call) and Anonymous Content  (Eternal Sunshine of the Spotless Mind). It was released on June 21, 2013, through Oscilloscope Laboratories.

Plot

The night before they are to be married, Phil’s (Philip Quinaz) fiancée Alison (Alison Fyhrie) gets cold feet and decides to call off their wedding. But, after breaking his heart, she manages to convince him to go through a sham ceremony, in order to save face in front of their friends and loved ones. Phil readily agrees, secretly hoping that the surprise wedding gift he has lined up for her will help her to reconsider her decision. Neither of them could have prepared themselves for the multitude of random complications that follow once the guests arrived to witness their breakup at a wedding.

Cast
Alison Fyhrie
Philip Quinaz
Victor Quinaz
Mary Grill
Chris Manley
Damian Lanigan
Anna Martemucci
Brian Shoaf
Caitlin Fitzgerald
Hugh Scully

Critical reception
The movie opened on August 8, 2013, in New York City and was well reviewed by The Village Voice, The New York Times, and New York Post, which gave the film three stars and said: "Breakup at a Wedding works, because Quinaz has come up with a concept that lets him skewer directorial pretension alongside wedding hysteria. He achieves a lot with harsh light, wavering focus and awful framing that occasionally beheads the person on-screen. It takes genuine skill to make a movie look this amusingly cruddy."

References

External links
 
 
 
 Breakup at a Wedding on Netflix
 Breakup At a Wedding on iTunes

American comedy films
2013 comedy films
2013 films
Films produced by Steve Golin
2010s American films